In Your Face is the second album by the hard rock band Kingdom Come. Two singles were released in support of the album, both becoming minor hits in the UK: "Do You Like It" (no. 73) and "Overrated" (no. 85). The band was due to tour the UK, supporting W.A.S.P., shortly after release of the second single, but split up before the tour commenced (ironically W.A.S.P. also lost guitarist and co-founder Chris Holmes at the same time, meaning they also had to cancel the tour). A third single "Stargazer" was pressed, but never officially released.

The 12" and CD single versions of "Do You Like It", includes the previously unreleased "Slow Down"; a song that did not make it onto the album.

In an interview, the band's members talk about the title of the album, saying that when you first look at the LP, you read "Kingdom Come", then, as you move your eyes downwards, you read "In your face". They laugh and say: "Kingdom come ... in your face, get it?", making an obscene joke or double entendre of it.

Track listing

Personnel
Kingdom Come
Lenny Wolf – lead vocals, rhythm guitar, producer
Danny Stag – lead guitar, acoustic guitar, backing vocals
Rick Steier – rhythm guitar, lead guitar on "Overrated", keyboards, backing vocals
Johnny B. Frank – bass, keyboards, backing vocals
James Kottak – drums

Production
Keith Olsen – producer, engineer, mixing
Gordon Fordyce – engineer, mixing
Shay Baby – assistant engineer
Greg Fulginiti – mastering at Artisan Sound Recorders, Hollywood
Hugh Syme – cover design
Scarpati – portrait photography

Charts

Album

Singles

References

External links
 In Your Face lyrics

1989 albums
Kingdom Come (band) albums
Polydor Records albums
Albums produced by Keith Olsen